Marty is a 1955 American romantic drama film directed by Delbert Mann in his directorial debut. The screenplay was written by Paddy Chayefsky, expanding upon his 1953 teleplay of the same name, which was broadcast on The Philco-Goodyear Television Playhouse and starred Rod Steiger in the title role.
 
The film stars Ernest Borgnine and Betsy Blair. In addition to winning the Academy Award for Best Picture, the film enjoyed international success, becoming the fourth American film to win the Palme d'Or. Marty, The Lost Weekend (1945) and Parasite (2019) are the only three films to win both organizations' grand prizes.

In 1994, Marty was deemed "culturally, historically or aesthetically significant" and selected for preservation in the Library of Congress' National Film Registry.

Plot
Marty Piletti is an Italian-American butcher who lives in The Bronx with his mother. Unmarried at 34, the good-natured but socially awkward Marty faces constant badgering from family and friends to settle down, as they point out that all his brothers and sisters are already married, most of them with children. Not averse to marriage but disheartened by his lack of prospects, Marty has reluctantly resigned himself to bachelorhood.

After being harassed by his mother into going to the Stardust Ballroom one Saturday night, Marty connects with Clara, a plain science teacher at Benjamin Franklin High School, who is quietly weeping on the roof after being callously abandoned at the ballroom by her blind date. They spend the evening together dancing, walking the busy streets, and talking in a diner. Marty eagerly spills out his life story and ambitions, and they encourage each other. He takes Clara to his house and they awkwardly express their mutual attraction, shortly before his mother returns. Marty takes her home by bus, promising to call her at 2:30 the next afternoon, after Mass. Overjoyed on his way back home, he punches the bus stop sign and weaves between the cars, looking for a cab instead.

Meanwhile, Marty's Aunt Catherine moves in to live with Marty and his mother. She warns his mother that Marty will soon marry and cast her aside. Fearing that Marty's romance could spell her abandonment, his mother belittles Clara. Marty's friends, with an undercurrent of envy, deride Clara for her plainness and try to convince him to forget her and to remain with them, unmarried, in their fading youth. Harangued into submission by the pull of his friends, Marty fails to call Clara.

That night, back in the same lonely rut, Marty realizes that he is giving up a woman whom he not only likes, but who makes him happy. Over the objections of his friends, he dashes to a phone booth to call Clara, who is disconsolately watching television with her parents. When his friend asks what he's doing, Marty bursts out saying:

Marty closes the phone booth's door when Clara answers the phone. In the last line of the film, he tentatively says "Hello...Hello, Clara?"

Cast

 Ernest Borgnine as Marty Piletti
 Betsy Blair as Clara Snyder
 Esther Minciotti as Mrs. Teresa Piletti, Marty's mother
 Augusta Ciolli as Aunt Catherine, Mrs. Piletti's sister 
 Joe Mantell as Angie, Marty's best friend 
 Karen Steele as Virginia, Aunt Catherine's daughter-in-law
 Jerry Paris as Tommy, Aunt Catherine's son
 Frank Sutton as Ralph (uncredited)

Production
For the film, Esther Minciotti, Augusta Ciolli and Joe Mantell reprised their roles from the live television production. The screenplay changed the name of the Waverly Ballroom to the Stardust Ballroom. The film expanded the role of Clara, and added subplots about Marty's career, his mother, and her sister.

Rod Steiger, who had played Marty in the teleplay, initially declined an offer to reprise the role after Harold Hecht and Burt Lancaster, the film's producers, demanded Steiger sign a multiple-picture commitment as a condition of retaining his role. Ernest Borgnine assumed the title role in Steiger's stead.

Shooting for the film began on September 7, 1954 in The Bronx and included many aspects of the borough into the film, such as Grand Concourse, Arthur Avenue, Gun Hill Road, White Plains Road, and several Bronx subway and elevated train lines, including the Concourse, Third Avenue, White Plains Road, and Jerome Avenue lines. On-set filming took place at Samuel Goldwyn Studios on November 1, 1954. Bronx native Jerry Orbach made his film debut in an uncredited role as a ballroom patron. Chayefsky had an uncredited cameo as Leo.

The role of Clara initially was going to be reprised by actress Nancy Marchand, later of Lou Grant and The Sopranos fame, who had portrayed the character in the television version. However, actress Betsy Blair was interested in playing the role and lobbied for it. At the time, Blair, who was married to actor Gene Kelly, had been blacklisted due to her Marxist and Communist sympathies. It was only through the lobbying of Kelly, who used his major star status and connections at MGM to pressure United Artists, that Blair got the role. Reportedly, Kelly threatened to withdraw from the film It's Always Fair Weather if Blair did not get the role of Clara.

Mann shot the film in 16 days and an additional three days for retakes.

Reception
Upon its premiere on April 11, 1955 (followed by a wide release on July 15), Marty received overwhelmingly positive reviews from critics. Ronald Holloway of Variety wrote "If Marty is an example of the type of material that can be gleaned, then studio story editors better spend more time at home looking at television." Time described the film as "wonderful". Louella Parsons enjoyed the film, but she felt that it would not likely be nominated for Oscars. At a budget of $343,000, the film generated revenues of $3 million in the U.S., making it a box-office success.

Rotten Tomatoes gives it a "Certified Fresh" 96% rating based on 77 reviews, with an average rating of 8.1/10. The site's consensus reads: "Scriptwriter Paddy Chayefsky's solid dialogue is bolstered by strong performances from Ernest Borgnine and Betsy Blair in this appealingly low-key character study."

The film is recognized by the American Film Institute.
 2002: AFI's 100 Years ... 100 Passions – 64

Awards and nominations

Marty received the first Palme d'Or ever awarded. Marty, The Lost Weekend and Parasite are the only films ever to win both the Academy Award for Best Picture and the highest award at the Cannes Film Festival (Marty and Parasite both received the Palme d'Or, which, beginning at the 1955 festival, replaced the Grand Prix du Festival International du Film as the highest award).. Marty is the shortest film ever to win Best Picture, at only 90 minutes.

See also
 List of American films of 1955

References

External links

 
 
 
 
 

1955 directorial debut films
1955 films
1955 romantic drama films
American romantic drama films
American black-and-white films
Best Picture Academy Award winners
1950s English-language films
Fictional butchers
Films based on television plays
Films directed by Delbert Mann
Films featuring a Best Actor Academy Award-winning performance
Films featuring a Best Drama Actor Golden Globe winning performance
Films produced by Burt Lancaster
Films produced by Harold Hecht
Films scored by Roy Webb
Films set in 1954
Films set in the Bronx
Films set in New York City
Films shot in New York City
Films whose director won the Best Directing Academy Award
Films whose writer won the Best Adapted Screenplay Academy Award
Films with screenplays by Paddy Chayefsky
Norma Productions films
Palme d'Or winners
Social realism in film
United Artists films
United States National Film Registry films
1950s American films